Spirit Lake is a city in Kootenai County, Idaho. The population was 1,945 at the time of the 2010 census, up from 1,376 in 2000. It is part of the Coeur d'Alene Metropolitan Statistical Area, which includes the entire county.

History
A post office called Spirit Lake has been in operation since 1903. The city took its name from nearby Spirit Lake.

Geography

Demographics

2010 census
As of the census of 2010, there were 1,945 people, 739 households, and 530 families living in the city. The racial makeup of the city was 96.3% White, 0.2% African American, 0.5% Native American, 0.4% Asian, 0.1% Pacific Islander, 0.6% from other races, and 1.9% from two or more races. Hispanic or Latino of any race were 2.8% of the population.

There were 739 households, of which 38.0% had children under the age of 18 living with them, 53.9% were married couples living together, 11.4% had a female householder with no husband present, 6.5% had a male householder with no wife present, and 28.3% were non-families. 22.6% of all households were made up of individuals, and 7.4% had someone living alone who was 65 years of age or older. The average household size was 2.63 and the average family size was 3.06.

The median age in the city was 37.8 years. 27.7% of residents were under the age of 18; 6.6% were between the ages of 18 and 24; 24.4% were from 25 to 44; 29.4% were from 45 to 64; and 11.9% were 65 years of age or older. The gender makeup of the city was 50.3% male and 49.7% female.

2000 census
As of the census of 2000, there were 1,376 people, 517 households, and 369 families living in the city. The racial makeup of the city was 95.57% White, 0.15% African American, 0.65% Native American, 0.15% Asian, 0.07% Pacific Islander, 1.45% from other races, and 1.96% from two or more races. Hispanic or Latino of any race were 2.40% of the population.

There were 517 households, out of which 37.9% had children under the age of 18 living with them, 55.7% were married couples living together, 10.4% had a female householder with no husband present, and 28.6% were non-families. 22.8% of all households were made up of individuals, and 7.4% had someone living alone who was 65 years of age or older. The average household size was 2.66 and the average family size was 3.07.

In the city, the population was spread out, with 29.9% under the age of 18, 5.7% from 18 to 24, 30.1% from 25 to 44, 24.2% from 45 to 64, and 10.1% who were 65 years of age or older. The median age was 36 years. For every 100 females, there were 94.6 males. For every 100 females age 18 and over, there were 98.8 males.

The median income for a household in the city was $28,854, and the median income for a family was $32,337. Males had a median income of $25,875 versus $18,092 for females. The per capita income for the city was $13,592. About 11.6% of families and 16.4% of the population were below the poverty line, including 20.8% of those under age 18 and 6.3% of those age 65 or over.

Education
 Timberlake High School
 Timberlake Junior High School
 Spirit Lake Elementary School

Notable residents
 Bobby Jenks, MLB pitcher

See also
 List of cities in Idaho

References

External links

 
 Chamber of Commerce - Spirit Lake, Idaho
 Lakeland School District #272 - public schools
History and photos of Spirit Lake

Cities in Kootenai County, Idaho
Cities in Idaho